Saira is a 2005 Indian film starring Navya Nair and Nedumudi Venu. The film marks the directorial debut of Dr. Biju. It was the opening selection in the Tous Les Cinemas du Monde (World Cinema) section of 2007 Cannes Film Festival. It also participated in 21 other international film festivals. It was also selected at the Indian Panorama 2006.

Premise
Saira is the daughter of the famous ghazal singer Ustad Ali Hussain, although she is fond of his music. Saira decides to become a news reporter but then Saira disappears. Ustad waits for Saira to return but she returns as a victim.

Cast
Navya Nair as Saira
Nedumudi Venu as Ustad Ali Hussain
Rajesh Sharma
Ineya
V.K. Baiju
Koodal Gopan
B.N. Radhakrishnan
Rajiv Venad
Somarajan Pilla
Thaleshan
Baby Safina
Master Mukundan
Master Devashambu
Baby Shahina
Baby Diana
Sahadevan

Awards
 2006: Kerala State Film Award for Best Actress - Navya Nair
 2006: Kerala State Film Award for Best Music Director - Ramesh Narayan
 2007: Zimbabwe International Film Festival: Best Actor - Nedumudi venu
 2006: Amrita TV Film Award for Best Actress - Navya Nair

Film festival screening

 Cannes international film festival 2007/Tous les cinemas du monde
 São Paulo international film festival 2006/Official competition
 Golden Minbar international film festival Russia 2006/Official competition
 Zimbabve international film festival 2007/Official competition
 Milan film festival, Italy 2007
 Eilat international film festival Israel 2007
 Panorama of independent filmmakers international film festival, Greese 2006
 Bangladhesh international film festival 2007
 New jersey Indian film festival USA 2007
 Brussels international film festival, Belgium 2007
 International film festival of India 2006 (Indian Panorama)
 Pune International film festival (2007)
 International film festival of Kerala (2006)
 Bangalore International film festival (2007)
 Hyderabad International film festival (2007)

References

2005 films
2000s Malayalam-language films
Films directed by Dr. Biju
2005 directorial debut films